Gorakhk (also Romanized as Gorākhk; also known as Gorāgh) is a village in Shandiz Rural District, Shandiz District, Torqabeh and Shandiz County, Razavi Khorasan Province, Iran. At the 2006 census, its population was 702, in 195 families.

References 

Populated places in Torqabeh and Shandiz County